Riho Lahi (27 October 1904 – 23 April 1995) was an Estonian writer, journalist and cartoonist, probably best known by his fictional character Kihva Värdi.

Lahi was born Richard-Heinrich Lahi in Võhma, Viljandi County.

Kihva Värdi
Kihva Värdi, supposedly born Ferdinand Kihv, was a well-known Estonian fictional character developed by Lahi. Kihva Värdi has been cited as a possible inspiration for the later fictional character of similar genre, Kärna Ärni. The character, active in the early decades of Soviet occupation of Estonia, regularly "wrote" editorials in a number of Estonian newspapers, commenting, in a humorous and censorship-tolerated way, on current political issues. His editorials have also been published in book form.

Värdi practiced a characteristic, well-recognisable in his era, writing style most prominent for consistently neglecting to join compound words, which are rather frequent in Estonian language. This and other stylistic cues paint him as middle-aged and poorly educated (or, as presented by Soviet authorities, "proletarian") man. This aura of proletarianism afforded Lahi some extra leeway in manœuvring through Soviet censorship.

See also 
 Kärna Ärni

External links 
 Postimees 27 October 2004: Kuidas ma vesteid aja lehe veergudele toimetasin by Raimu Hanson

1904 births
1995 deaths
Estonian male writers
Estonian journalists
Estonian cartoonists
People from Võhma
20th-century Estonian writers
20th-century journalists